Gregory A. de Vries (born January 4, 1973) is a Canadian former professional ice hockey player. He played over 800 games with six teams in the National Hockey League (NHL). de Vries won the Stanley Cup with the Colorado Avalanche in 2000–01 season.

Playing career
de Vries grew up playing minor hockey in his hometown of Sundridge, Ontario in the OMHA's Georgian Bay-Parry Sound Minor hockey league. In Bantam, he played for the North Bay Cortina Astros AAA club in 1988–89.  The following year, de Vries signed with the Aurora Eagles Jr.A. club of the OHA.

In May 1990, de Vries was drafted in the third round (35th overall) by the Niagara Falls Thunder in the OHL Priority Selection. de Vries, however, decided that he would forego major junior hockey and pursue an NCAA scholarship.

The following season (1990–91), de Vries signed with the Stratford Cullitons Jr.B. club and teamed with future NHL defenseman, Chris Pronger.

In 1991–92, de Vries accepted a scholarship at Bowling Green State University (CCHA). He left BGSU for the OHL Niagara Falls Thunder in September 1992.

Undrafted, de Vries was signed by the Edmonton Oilers on March 20, 1994, as a free agent. de Vries was signed from junior team Niagara Falls Thunder of the Ontario Hockey League and made his professional debut at the end of the 1993–94 season with Oilers affiliate, the Cape Breton Oilers of the American Hockey League (AHL).

On October 1, 1998, de Vries was traded by the Oilers, along with Drake Berehowsky and Éric Fichaud to the Nashville Predators for Jim Dowd and Mikhail Shtalenkov, but less than a month later on October 24 was traded to the Colorado Avalanche for a second-round draft pick.  He played five seasons in Colorado, becoming a fixture in the Avalanche defense and winning the Stanley Cup in 2001.

On July 14, 2003, he left the Avalanche and signed as a free agent with the New York Rangers for the 2003–04 season. de Vries however, was traded at the deadline on March 9, 2004, to the Ottawa Senators for Karel Rachunek and prospect Alexandre Giroux. While brought in to help the Senators in the playoffs, they lost in the first round.

After the 2004 NHL Lockout, he was traded by the Senators along with Marián Hossa on August 23, 2005, to the Atlanta Thrashers for Dany Heatley. de Vries' inclusion in that deal was strictly financial, as Senators' management deemed his on-ice performance was not in line with his big contract. After two seasons with the Thrashers, de Vries left as a free agent and signed with former team the Nashville Predators on July 2, 2007.

He currently divides his time between Stratford, Ontario and Brentwood, Tennessee.

Career statistics

Awards and honours

References

External links

1973 births
Atlanta Thrashers players
Bowling Green Falcons men's ice hockey players
Canadian ice hockey defencemen
Cape Breton Oilers players
Colorado Avalanche players
Edmonton Oilers players
Hamilton Bulldogs (AHL) players
Ice hockey people from Ontario
Living people
Nashville Predators players
New York Rangers players
Niagara Falls Thunder players
Ottawa Senators players
People from Parry Sound District
Stanley Cup champions
Undrafted National Hockey League players